Bacha posh (literally "dressed up as a boy") is a practice in Afghanistan and parts of Pakistan in which some families without sons will pick a daughter to live and behave as a boy. This enables the child to behave more freely: attending school, escorting her sisters in public, and working.

Origins
The custom is documented at least one century ago, but is likely to be much older, and is still practiced today.
It may have started with women disguising themselves as men to fight, or to be protected, during periods of wartime.

Historian Nancy Dupree told a reporter from The New York Times that she recalled a photograph dating back to the early 1900s during the reign of Habibullah Khan in which women dressed as men guarded the king's harem because officially, the harem could be guarded by neither women nor men. "Segregation calls for creativity," she said, "These people have the most amazing coping capability."

Overview
In Afghanistan, there is societal pressure for families to have a son to carry on the family name and to inherit the father's property. In the absence of a son, families may dress one of their daughters as a male, with some adhering to the belief that having a bacha posh will make it more likely for a mother to give birth to a son in a subsequent pregnancy.

A girl living as a boy will dress in characteristic male clothing, have her hair cut short, and use a male name. The purpose of the practice is not deception and many people, such as teachers or family friends, will be aware that the child is actually a girl. In her family, she will occupy an intermediate status in which she is treated as neither a daughter nor fully as a son, but she will not need to cook or clean like other girls. As a bacha posh, a girl is more readily able to attend school, run errands, move freely in public, escort her sisters in places where they could not be without a male companion, play sports and find work.

The girl's status as a bacha posh usually ends when she enters puberty. Women raised as a bacha posh often have difficulty making the transition from life as a boy and adapting to the traditional constraints placed on women in Afghan society.

Azita Rafaat, a legislator elected to the National Assembly of Afghanistan to represent Badghis Province, has had no sons and has raised one of her daughters as a bacha posh. She said she understood that "it's very hard for you to believe why one mother is doing these things to their youngest daughter," and that "things are happening in Afghanistan that is really not imaginable for you as a Western people."

Prevalence and acceptability
The cultural practice of bacha posh was originally non-publicized outside of the Middle East. However, as a result of media productions bacha posh and their role in society is slowly being revealed. There are no statistics on how many families have daughters "dressed as a boy," due to the somewhat secretive nature of the practice. Only the main family, family friends, and necessary health and education officials know the bacha posh's biological sex. It is tolerated and acknowledged by society in the main, and seen as a practical solution for those without an heir or accompanying male figure. Although it is tolerated, a bacha posh can be bullied and teased for not conforming to religious beliefs and social norms once discovered to be female. Once revealed, a bacha posh can receive stigmatization similar to that felt by the LGBT community, without actually identifying as such.

Effects
Developmental and clinical psychologist Diane Ehrensaft theorizes that, by behaving like boys, the bacha posh is not expressing their true gender identity, but simply conforming to parents' hopes and expectations. She cites parents offering their daughters privileges girls otherwise wouldn't get, such as the chance to cycle and to play soccer and cricket, as well as bacha posh complaining that they aren't comfortable around boys, and would rather live as a girl.

After having lived as bacha posh for some time though, most find it hard to socialize again with girls as they have become comfortable with socializing with boys. Elaha, who was a bacha posh for twenty years, but switched back to being a girl when she entered university, told the BBC that she switched back only because of traditions of society. One reason it's so hard for a bacha posh to return to girlhood is that they act the role of a boy when they are supposed to be developing their personalities, so they end up developing more stereotypical masculine personality traits. Some bacha posh feel as if they've lost essential childhood memories and their identities as girls. Others feel that it was good to experience the freedoms that they would not have had if they'd been normal girls growing up in Afghanistan.  The change itself can also be very hard as most, if not all, rights and privileges of the "boys" are taken away when transitioning back into a women's role; many women do not wish to go back upon experiencing the freedoms of a boy. Jenny Nordberg, author of The Underground Girls of Kabul, said that many don't return to live as women and that it is "very complicated psychologically" on an individual level.

When a bacha posh reaches marrying age, commonly at 15–17, and/or when their feminine forms become more pronounced, it is usually then that the father will decide to return the bacha posh to their female form again. Nevertheless, being a bacha posh of marriageable age, the women can have a say on the decision. However, if this means going against their father's wishes (and thereby, the family's wishes), the young bacha posh can end up further marginalized, without familial support in a highly family-oriented society. As the majority of bacha posh spend their prepubescent years in a male role, many skip learning the necessary skills to become the ideal wife. Subsequently, many experience anxiety over the transition to womanhood.

The heart of the controversy over this practice, in terms of the recent movement for Afghan women's rights, is whether the practice of bacha posh empowers women and helps them succeed or if the practice is psychologically damaging. Many of the women who have gone through the process say they feel that the experience was empowering as well as smothering. The true problem, activists say, is not the practice itself, but women's rights in that society.

In media
 Nadia Hashimi's 2014 novel The Pearl that Broke Its Shell
 Jenny Nordberg's book The Underground Girls of Kabul: In Search of a Hidden Resistance in Afghanistan 
 Iranian movie director Majid Majidi's 2001 film Baran.
 Osama, a 2003 Afghan film written and directed by Siddiq Barmak. It tells the story of a young girl in Afghanistan under Taliban rule who disguises herself as a boy, Osama, in order to support her family, as her father and uncle had both been killed during the Soviet-Afghan War, and she and her mother would not be able to travel on their own without a male "legal companion."
 Nadia Hashimi's 2016 children's novel One Half from the East
 The animated feature film The Breadwinner, 2017, from Deborah Ellis' 2001 children's book Parvana, is about a girl who dresses as a boy to support her family.
A Second Birth by Ariel Mitchell. A play set in southern Afghanistan in which a family struggles with the tradition of bacha posh. New York City premiere: THML Theatre Company  at The Center at West Park, March 1–24, 2019. Development, production history, awards.

See also
Albanian sworn virgins
Crossdressing

References

External links
 Women's View on News

Afghan culture
Transgender in Asia
Transgender in the Middle East
Cross-dressing
Gender systems
Pakistani culture
Women in Afghanistan
Women in Pakistan